Patteson Womersley Nickalls    (23 January 1877 – 10 September 1946), was an English polo player who competed in the 1908 Summer Olympics for Great Britain.

Biography
Nickalls was born on 23 January 1877 at North Weald, Essex, the son of Sir Patteson Nickalls, a stockbroker, and his wife Florence.  He was educated at Rugby School. There he was in the cricket XI from 1892 to 1894 and in the rugby XV in 1893. He went to New College, Oxford, played in the Varsity Match for the Oxford University Polo Club in 1895-6-7 and graduated with a BA in 1897. In 1900, he was gazetted to the Durham Light Infantry and served in the Second Anglo-Boer War. He took part in the Relief of Ladysmith and the Battle of Colenso. He retired from the army in 1901 and became a member of the London Stock Exchange.

Nickalls played polo for England in the 1902 International Polo Cup matches. He was a member of the winning teams in the Roehampton Trophy in 1904 and 1905. In 1905 he played for the Roehampton Club and in 1908 the Roehampton team represented Great Britain at the 1908 Summer Olympics in London and won the gold medal. He captained the Enghsh team against America in 1909 in the Westchester Cup with a handicap of +8

Nickalls served on the Western Front in World War I in the Northamptonshire Yeomanry. He wrote an account of fox hunting behind the lines in 1916. He remained a major in the Territorial Reserve, having been awarded the Distinguished Service Order in 1918, until 1926.

Nickalls died on 10 September 1946 at the age of 69.

External links
Olympic Players profile

References 

1877 births
1946 deaths
People educated at Rugby School
Durham Light Infantry officers
English polo players
English Olympic medallists
Polo players at the 1908 Summer Olympics
Olympic polo players of Great Britain
Olympic gold medallists for Great Britain
Patteson Womersley
International Polo Cup
Roehampton Trophy
British Army personnel of the Second Boer War
Northamptonshire Yeomanry officers
Companions of the Distinguished Service Order
Medalists at the 1908 Summer Olympics
Olympic medalists in polo